Sinister 2 (stylized in marketing as Sinister II) is a 2015 supernatural horror film directed by Ciarán Foy and written by Scott Derrickson and C. Robert Cargill, serving as a sequel to the 2012 film Sinister, and stars James Ransone, reprising his role from the original film, alongside Shannyn Sossamon. The film follows the now ex-deputy as he attempts to put an end to Bughuul's curse, while a boy is being tormented by the entity's previous victims who lived in the house where he, his twin brother, and mother now reside, hiding from his abusive father. Unlike the first film, which utilized 8 mm film in the story's home movies and snuff films, this film utilized 16 mm film, vinyl records, and ham radio broadcasts in the film’s storyline.

Sinister 2 was a co-production of Alliance Films, IM Global, Blumhouse Productions, Steady Aim Productions, Tank Caterpillar, Inc., and Automatik Entertainment, and released on August 21, 2015, by Focus Features through their Gramercy Pictures banner in the United States, and Entertainment One in Canada and the United Kingdom.  The film received negative reviews from critics, with criticism for its jump scares, horror clichés and story, while Ransone's performance received some praise. The film grossed over $54 million against its reported budget of $10 million.

Plot
The film opens with a home movie depicting a family of three. The family is bound and hung up like scarecrows with sacks over their heads in a cornfield and burned alive. It is revealed to be the nightmare of 9-year-old Dylan Collins, who is squatting in a rural farmhouse next to a deconsecrated church, with his twin brother Zach and their mother Courtney, who are all running from Clint (Courtney's abusive husband and Zach and Dylan's father). Dylan is visited nightly by a group of ghostly children who coerce him to watch "home movies" of families being murdered in various ways (Fishing Trip, Christmas Morning, and Kitchen Remodel).

Former sheriff's deputy "So-and-So", now a private investigator, is researching the murders connected to Bughuul and burning down the homes where each murder took place before another family can move into them, including the house where the Ellison Oswalt massacre took place. He arrives at the farmhouse, but finds the family living there, telling Courtney he is there to investigate the church where a murder took place.

Clint shows up at the farmhouse to take the boys, but leaves after the Deputy informs he needs a court order. Courtney wants to leave but the Deputy convinces her not to, knowing that leaving would continue the murders connected to Bughuul. Courtney invites him to stay overnight, and the two develop a budding romance.

The Deputy meets with Prof. Stromberg, who has come into possession of a ham radio that belonged to Prof. Jonas, who has mysteriously disappeared, revealing that the radio first belonged to a Norwegian family from 1973. He plays a recording of a young girl yelling to her mother before killing her family and playing the piano. Prof. Stromberg reveals that Bughuul was believed to be reachable by ritual/sacrifice and to have been feeding on the corruption of innocents, with three common traits present: a murdered family, missing children, and an iconological totem/offering in the form of art as an "aesthetic observance of violence", in order to summon Bughuul. The Deputy orders Stromberg to destroy the ham radio.

Zach becomes jealous of the ghost children's attention to Dylan and begins to act out. The children show Dylan the video of the church murders (Sunday Service). After Dylan refuses to watch the last movie, the children turn their attention to Zach and abandon Dylan, saying he is not their real target. Dylan watches the last reel (A Trip to the Dentist).

Clint arrives with the court order and Courtney goes with him to protect her sons. The Deputy drives to Clint's home to warn them about the danger, but Clint beats him up and threatens the Deputy to leave. The next day, Zach films his family in an outdoor hangout. That night, Dylan contacts the Deputy for help as he and his parents lose consciousness.

Courtney, Dylan, and Clint are drugged and hung on scarecrow posts with sacks over their heads in the cornfield by Clint's house (similar to Dylan's nightmare in the opening scene). A possessed Zach douses his family in three separate trails of gasoline, lights Clint on fire, and films his death. The Deputy arrives at the Collins' residence, finding and hitting Zach with his car. He frees Courtney and Dylan as they flee into the cornfield. However, Zach survives and chases after them.

Inside the home, the ghost children try to help Zach find them. Just as Zach is about to kill Courtney and Dylan, the Deputy manages to destroy the camera, breaking the cycle. Zach is shamed by the ghost children for failing. Bughuul appears and as punishment Zach's body decays rapidly, with a cloth projection screen bursting into flames, causing the house to catch on fire as the Deputy, Courtney, and Dylan escape.

Later, while collecting his things to leave with Courtney and Dylan, the Deputy finds the ham radio in his motel room with the ghost children begin speaking through it as Bughuul jumpscares.

Cast

Production

Development

A sequel to Sinister (2012) was announced to be in the works in March 2013, with writers Scott Derrickson and C. Robert Cargill returning, but the former not directing as he did on the first film.

On April 2014, it was announced that Ciarán Foy would direct the film, and Brian Kavanaugh-Jones, Charles Layton, Xavier Marchand, and Patrice Théroux would executive produce the sequel with eOne Entertainment.

Filming
Principal photography began on August 19, 2014, in Chicago. It was shot for six weeks in locations including St. Anne and outside the village of Grant Park.

Post-production
On May 20, 2015, Focus Features relaunched their Gramercy Pictures label for action, horror, and science-fiction films. Sinister 2 was one of Gramercy's new releases.

Release
Sinister 2 released theatrically in the United States on August 21, 2015, and was distributed by Focus Features.

Home media
Sinister 2 was released on DVD and Blu-ray on January 12, 2016.

Reception

Box office
The movie grossed $27,740,955 domestically and $26,363,270 internationally. The film earned $850,000 in ticket sales from late-night showings on Thursday and by the end of its first week, the movie earned $10,542,116, lower than its predecessor which pulled in $18,007,634.

Critical response
Rotten Tomatoes gave the film an approval rating of 14%, based on 91 reviews with an average rating of 4/10. The site's critical consensus reads, "Sinister 2 has a few ingredients that will be familiar to fans of the original; unfortunately, in this slapdash second installment, none of them are scary anymore." Metacritic gives the film a score of 32 out of 100, based on reviews from 17 critics, indicating "generally unfavorable reviews". Audiences polled by CinemaScore gave the film an average grade of "B−" on an A+ to F scale.

IGN awarded it a score of 1 out of 10, rating it "unbearable". The site says, "Sinister 2 is an abysmal follow-up to its predecessor. At least that film knew that less is more. And less is scarier." MoviePilot also awarded the film 1 out of 10, calling it "one of the worst horror films of the last few years."

Future
Prior to the release of Insidious: The Last Key, Jason Blum stated that a crossover film between Sinister and the Insidious series had previously been in development, tentatively entitled Insinister, and that he personally believed it had potential for re-entering it, stating that "we're going to cross our worlds at some point".

References

External links
 
 

2015 films
2015 horror films
Films shot in Chicago
American sequel films
Films about snuff films
American ghost films
American supernatural horror films
Blumhouse Productions films
Demons in film
Entertainment One films
Focus Features films
Gramercy Pictures films
Films produced by Jason Blum
Films about nightmares
Films about domestic violence
Films about child abuse
Films scored by Tomandandy
Films set on farms
Religious horror films
2010s English-language films
2010s American films
2010s Canadian films
English-language Canadian films